The 2014 Brantford municipal election took place on October 27, 2014. Incumbent Mayor Chris Friel was re-elected.

Mayoral candidates 
Chris Friel, incumbent Mayor
Jan Vanderstelt, local businessman and Ward 1 City Councillor
Dave Wrobel, Ward 4 City Councillor
Mike St. Amant, local businessman
Mark Littell, former City Councillor
Mary Ellen Kaye, activist
John Turmel, perennial candidate

Results

Mayor

References

Brantford
Municipal elections in Brantford